Contributions to Philosophy (Of the Event)) is a work by German philosopher Martin Heidegger. It was first translated into English by Parvis Emad and Kenneth Maly and published by Indiana University Press in 1999 as Contributions to Philosophy (From Enowning). In 2012, a new translation was produced by Richard Rojcewicz and Daniela Vallega-Neu and published by Indiana University Press as Contributions to Philosophy (Of the Event). Composed privately between 1936 and 1938, but not available to the public until it was published in Germany in 1989, the work is thought to reflect "the turn" (die Kehre) in Heidegger's thought after Being and Time (1927).

Summary
In Contributions to Philosophy (From Enowning), Heidegger builds on the notions of earth and world, which he had previously introduced in "The Origin of the Work of Art", and introduces the concept of "the last god". The result is a move away from the centrality of the phenomenological analyses of Dasein, toward the grounding of Dasein as a historical decision of human beings. Earth can be understood as the condition of possibilities for the world; neither earth nor world can exist without the other, and are thus engaged in a constant and productive struggle or strife. This struggle exists in the crossing from the "first beginning" of Western thought, which began with the ancient Greeks and determined the entire history of metaphysics, to the "other beginning", which will move beyond metaphysics by properly and originally posing the question of the truth of being (Sein). In a parallel fashion, human beings counter god(s), and a space between these four points is opened up for the moment of "enowning", which grounds the "essential sway" of being. The up-welling of the present comes from the future before itself. This means that the being in the now changes the being of the future and thus our utilization of our being in the past.

The "Preview" to Contributions lays out provisionally the unfolding of the work and the methodology, here centered on grounding "the essential swaying of be-ing" rather than on the existential analytic of Dasein put forward in Being and Time. The work is organized into six "joinings", which reflect the crossing to the new or other beginning, and are each equally original in the shift from man as animal rationale to man as Dasein, and from the shift from thinking as representation to inceptual, or be-ing-historical, thinking:

 Echo: the constant interplay between being and be-ing as not granting, or self-sheltering. In this chapter, Heidegger discusses the necessary ills of machination, the gigantic, and calculation, which out of the history of metaphysics reduce the question of be-ing to the belief that all beings — the focus of metaphysics — are created, reproducible, and entirely explainable. This is "necessary" because it is always already a part of the history of the first beginning, and the only thing distressing enough to potentially lead to a more originary distress, which leads to the creative question of be-ing.
 Playing-Forth refers to the hermeneutical relationship between the first beginning and the other beginning, bringing to mind Being and Time'''s destruction of the history of ontology. Metaphysics is not to be defeated, but rather to be truly understood for the first time, an understanding that will ground this thinking in its history, and allow for the true question of philosophy to be raised.
 Leap: the posing of the question of be-ing is the leap. The leap does not know what it is leaping into or towards, but in leaping opens up the space for more originary thinking. Since da-sein is'' projecting-opening, the leap opens a site in which the essential swaying of be-ing may be grounded in thinking-saying. The leap may simply be an originary phenomenological reduction: the leap into a genuine shift in thinking, and a new beginning in the history of philosophy.
 Grounding
 The Ones to Come
 The Last God

References

1989 non-fiction books
Books by Martin Heidegger
Daseinsanalysis
German non-fiction books
Phenomenology literature
Indiana University Press books